Antonio Ciacca is a jazz pianist.

Early life
Ciacca was born in Germany and brought up in Italy. He began playing the piano at the age of seven. He has been taught by Steve Grossman, Kenny Barron, Marcus Belgrave and Barry Harris.

Later life and career
Ciacca toured Europe with the Larry Smith Quartet in 1995 and 1996, played in Japan with the Eiji Nakayama Quartet in 1998, and toured Europe with Joe Henderson and Steve Lacy in 1999. Ciacca studied further with Jaki Byard in 1998–99, and dedicated the album Hollis Avenue to him. Ciacca founded the Detroit Gospel Singers, and toured Europe with them in 2000. He has a master's degree in Afro-American musicology from the University of Bologna. He became Director of Programming at Jazz at Lincoln Center in 2007, resigning in 2011.
Dr. Ciacca earned his master's degree in jazz studies at City College in New York City and his DMA (Doctor of Musica Arts) at Stony Brook University.

Musical style
The DownBeat reviewer of the album Lagos Blues wrote: "Ciacca is informed by a broad range of influences. Two are particularly obvious, those being hard bop and Duke Ellington."

Discography

As leader

As sideman
 Larry Smith & Co Live at the Slovak Phihlarmonic (1996)
 Larry Smith Quartet Estate (1998)
 Detroit Gospel Singers Gospel Jubilee (2000)
 Craig Bailey Sextet Brooklyn (2001)
 Detroit Gospel Singers "Gospel Jubilee" Alma Records (2001)
 Various Artists Gubbio No Border Festival (2004)
 Dario Mazzucco Light Lunch (2008)
 Lucio Ferrara Quintet Featuring Lee Konitz & Antonio Ciacca It's All Right with Me (2009)
 Stefania Tchantret Quintet Love For Sale (2010)
 Sweet Lu Olutosin "Sweet Lu's Blues" TwinsMusic Records (2014)
 Debora Tamagnini with the Antonio Ciacca quartet "Camellia" Beat Sound (2016)
 Mara De Mutiis with the Antonio Ciacca Quintet "The men I love" Dodicilune Records (2016)
 Antonio Belladelli with the Antonio Ciacca Quartet "Save Your Love for Me" Jazz3 (2016)
 Francesco Alemanno Quintet, "The Nearness of You" Dodicilune records (2017)
 Antonio Belladelli with The Antonio Ciacca Hammond Trio "It Might Be Swing... 'round Midnight" Jazz3 (2017)
 Jamile Saevie Ayres, "If you could see me now" (2019)

References

1969 births
Living people
Post-bop pianists
Hard bop pianists
Mainstream jazz pianists
American jazz pianists
American male pianists
American jazz bandleaders
American jazz educators
German emigrants to the United States
Place of birth missing (living people)
Juilliard School faculty
20th-century American pianists
21st-century American pianists
20th-century American male musicians
21st-century American male musicians
American male jazz musicians
Motéma Music artists